Club Deportivo Coslada is a Spanish football team based in Coslada, in the autonomous Community of Madrid. Founded in 1972, it plays in Preferente at Level 6 of the Spanish football pyramid, holding home games at Estadio Municipal El Olivo, with a capacity of 2,500 seats.

Season to season

13 seasons in Tercera División

External links
Official website 
Futmadrid team profile 

Football clubs in the Community of Madrid
Association football clubs established in 1972
Divisiones Regionales de Fútbol clubs
1972 establishments in Spain